The 2016–17 season was the club's third season in the Scottish Premiership. Hamilton also competed in the Scottish Cup and the League Cup. Hamilton secured their top flight status for the 2017–18 season by beating Dundee United 1–0 on aggregate in the Premiership play-off final.

Summary

Management
The club began the 2016–17 season under the continued management of Martin Canning who also extended his own playing contract, staying as the player-manager for the club.

After saving the club from relegation through the play-offs, manager Martin Canning thanked the board for sticking with him throughout the season.

Results & fixtures

Scottish Premiership

Premiership Play Off

Scottish League Cup

Knockout round

Scottish Cup

Squad statistics

Appearances
As of 20 May 2017

|-
|colspan="10"|Players who left the club during the 2016–17 season
|-

|}

Team statistics

League table

League Cup Table

Transfers

In

Out

References

Hamilton Academical F.C. seasons
Hamilton Academical